Italian submarine Uebi Scebeli was an  built for the Royal Italian Navy (Regia Marina) during the 1930s. It was named after Shebelle River in Ethiopia.

Design and description
The Adua-class submarines were essentially repeats of the preceding . They displaced  surfaced and  submerged.

For surface running, the boats were powered by two  diesel engines, each driving one propeller shaft. When submerged each propeller was driven by a  electric motor. They could reach  on the surface and  underwater.

The boats were armed with six internal  torpedo tubes, four in the bow and two in the stern. One reload torpedo was carried for each tube, for a total of twelve. They were also armed with one  deck gun for combat on the surface. The light anti-aircraft armament consisted of one or two pairs of   machine guns.

Construction and career 

Uebi Scebeli was built at the Tosi shipyard at Taranto. She was launched on 3 October 1937 and commissioned on 21 December the same year. After delivery, Uebi Scebeli was assigned to 43rd Squadron based at Taranto. In 1938 she was reassigned to Tobruk but returned to Taranto by the end of 1939 and was assigned to the 46th Squadron (IV Submarine Group).

On 10 June 1940, after the declaration of war, Uebi Scebeli was sent out to patrol off Cerigotto but returned to the base five days later on 15 June 1940 without encountering any traffic.

On her second mission Uebi Scebeli was sent out to a defensive patrol in the Gulf of Taranto.

Her third and last mission started on 27 June 1940, when she left Taranto under the command of Capt. Bruno Zani, heading to her assigned area of operation, approximately 35 miles northeast of Derna.

Uebi Scebeli had to make a quick dive to a periscope depth, and tried to launch an attack, but it was detected by the British destroyers, and was heavily bombarded with depth charges that caused serious damage. Due to sustained heavy damage, the crew had to scuttle the submarine at approximately 7:00 in the position .

The crew managed to throw overboard most of the secret documents, but some of them were retrieved by the British, including a copy of the Sommergibili Italiani SM 19/S code book. All crew members were rescued and captured by the British.

Notes

References
 

Adua-class submarines
World War II submarines of Italy
Lost submarines of Italy
Maritime incidents in June 1940
World War II shipwrecks in the Mediterranean Sea
1937 ships
Ships built by Cantieri navali Tosi di Taranto
Ships built in Taranto
Submarines sunk by British warships